Clube Desportivo Kei Lun; is a Macanese football club which is currently on hiatus. The club last competed in the 2017 Liga de Elite.

Current squad

References

Football clubs in Macau